"Can You Move" aka Can You Move It aka Can You Dance ak Salsa Rappsody is a single by UK band Modern Romance. It was released in the United States in 1982 as a 12-inch single by Atlantic Records, and in Japan as a 7-inch single through WEA.

History
"Can You Move" - also related to Can You Dance is a single by Modern Romance that was released primarily in the United States, where it reached #2 on the Dance Chart. It was released in Japan in 1982. The single also backs their UK hit, "Queen of the Rapping Scene (Nothing Ever Goes the Way You Plan)" (1982), which peaked at #37 on the UK chart. "Can You Move" was re-released as "Can You Move '88" by band member, David Jaymes.

Formats

7-inch single (Japan)
Can You Move It
Queen of the Rapping Scene

12-inch single (America)
Can You Move [Vocal Midnight Mix]
Can You Move [Instrumental Midnight Mix]

12-inch promo (America)
Can You Move [Vocal Midnight Mix]
Can You Move [Instrumental Midnight Mix]

Chart performance

Personnel
Geoff Deane - vocals
David Jaymes - bass guitar
Robbie Jaymes - synthesizer
Paul Gendler - guitar
Andy Kyriacou - drums
Richie Rivera - Mixer dance

References

1981 singles
Modern Romance (band) songs
1981 songs
Songs written by Geoff Deane
Atlantic Records singles